Fire Trap or similar terms may refer to:

 The Fire Trap, a 1935 crime drama film about an insurance investigator pursuing arsonists
 Firetrap, a British clothing company
 Firetrap (Transformers), a Transformers character